Ducati World Racing Challenge, known in Europe as Ducati World, is a racing game developed by Attention to Detail and published by Acclaim Entertainment for PlayStation, Microsoft Windows, and Dreamcast in 2001.

Development
The game was announced in June 2000.

Reception

The PlayStation and PC versions received "mixed or average reviews", while the Dreamcast version received "unfavorable" reviews, according to the review aggregation website Metacritic. BBC Sport gave the PC version a favorable review, a few weeks before its release date.

Notes

References

External links
 

2001 video games
Acclaim Entertainment games
Attention to Detail games
Dreamcast games
Ducati (company)
Motorcycle video games
PlayStation (console) games
Racing video games
Video games developed in the United Kingdom
Windows games